Andrei Korshunov is a Russian equestrian. At the 2012 Summer Olympics he competed in the Individual eventing competition.

References

Russian male equestrians

Living people
Olympic equestrians of Russia
Equestrians at the 2012 Summer Olympics
Year of birth missing (living people)